Eyvind Clausen (18 June 1939 - 10 August 2013) was a Danish footballer who played nine games for the national team between 1962 and 1963.

References

External links 
 

1939 births
2013 deaths
Danish men's footballers
Kjøbenhavns Boldklub players
Association football forwards
Footballers from Copenhagen
Denmark youth international footballers
Denmark under-21 international footballers
Denmark international footballers